The enzyme hydroxyglutamate decarboxylase catalyzes the chemical reaction

3-hydroxy-L-glutamate  4-amino-3-hydroxybutanoate + CO2

Hence, this enzyme has one substrate, 3-hydroxy-L-glutamate, and two products, 4-amino-3-hydroxybutanoate and CO2.

This enzyme belongs to the family of lyases, specifically the carboxy-lyases, which cleave carbon-carbon bonds.  The systematic name of this enzyme class is 3-hydroxy-L-glutamate 1-carboxy-lyase (4-amino-3-hydroxybutanoate-forming). This enzyme is also called 3-hydroxy-L-glutamate 1-carboxy-lyase.  It employs one cofactor, pyridoxal phosphate.

References

 

EC 4.1.1
Pyridoxal phosphate enzymes
Enzymes of unknown structure